Vincent W. Lloyd is an American theologian and author. He is director of Africana Studies at Villanova University.

Lloyd has a BA from Princeton University, a MA from University of California, Berkeley, and PhD from the University of California, Berkeley.

Books
Black Dignity: The Struggle Against Domination (Yale University Press, 2022)
Break Every Yoke: Religion, Justice, and the Abolition of Prisons, with Joshua Dubler (Oxford University Press, 2019)
In Defense of Charisma (Columbia University Press, 2018)
Religion of the Field Negro: On Black Secularism and Black Theology (Fordham University Press, 2017)
Black Natural Law (Oxford University Press, 2016)
The Problem with Grace: Reconfiguring Political Theology (Stanford University Press, 2011)
Law and Transcendence: On the Unfinished Project of Gillian Rose (Palgrave, 2009)
Anti-Blackness and Christian Ethics (Orbis, 2017) Co-Editor
Race and Secularism in America (Columbia University Press, 2016) Co-Editor
Sainthood and Race: Marked Flesh, Holy Flesh (Routledge, 2014) Co-Editor
Race and Political Theology (Stanford University Press, 2012) editor
Secular Faith (Cascade, 2010) Co-Editor

References

21st-century American male writers
21st-century American theologians
Princeton University alumni
University of California, Berkeley alumni
Villanova University faculty
Living people
Year of birth missing (living people)
American male non-fiction writers
21st-century American academics